Richard Griffith Seed (1928 – 2013) was an American physicist and entrepreneur best known for forcing a national debate on human cloning in the late 1990s.

Life and career

Seed was born in Chicago and graduated from Oak Park and River Forest High School in Illinois before attending Harvard University, earning his undergraduate degree there in 1949. He later received a master's degree, as well as a Ph.D. in physics from Harvard in 1953. His interests soon shifted to the new frontier of biomedicine. In the 1970s Seed co-founded a company that commercialized a technique for transferring embryos in cattle. Later, he and his brother, Chicago surgeon Randolph Seed, started another company, Fertility & Genetics Research Inc., to help infertile women conceive children using the same technique. These efforts to transplant a human embryo from one woman to an infertile surrogate mother were published in 1984. The cumbersome procedure involved flushing embryos out of the uterus of the egg donor—and was soon eclipsed by in-vitro fertilization. Ultimately the venture failed.

On December 5, 1997, Seed announced that he planned to clone a human being before any federal laws could be enacted to ban the process. Seed's announcement added fuel to the raging ethical debate on human cloning that had been sparked by Ian Wilmut's creation of Dolly the sheep, the first clone obtained from adult cells. Seed's plans were to use the same technique used by the Scottish team. Seed's announcement went against President Clinton's 1997 proposal for a voluntary private moratorium against human cloning. In the media frenzy that followed, the story of a 69-year-old eccentric, and maverick scientist emerged, but Seed possessed impressive credentials and was not dismissed immediately. While virtually no mainstream scientist believed Seed would succeed, there began a subtle shift in attitudes after Seed made his announcement.

Retired at the time of his announcement to clone the first human, Seed was reported to have dabbled in ill-fated ventures in the past. He claimed at one time to have commitments for $800,000 toward a goal of $2.5 million needed to clone the first human before 2000. Seed first said that he was going to make little baby clones for infertile couples. Later, "to defuse criticism that I'm taking advantage of desperate women," he announced that he would first clone himself. Still later he announced that he would re-create his wife Gloria. "God made man in his own image," he told National Public Radio correspondent Joe Palca in December 1997. "God intended for man to become one with God. Cloning, is the first serious step in becoming one with God." In a later interview on CNN, Seed elaborated: "Man," he said, "will develop the technology and the science and the capability to have an indefinite life span."

Seed was awarded the 1998 Ig Nobel Prize in economics, and a performance titled The Seedy Opera debuted at the event.

Selected publications

References

External links

1928 births
Living people
Scientists from Chicago
Human subject research in the United States
Cloning
Harvard University alumni